Christoph Zeller (born 1956 or 1957) is a German billionaire businessman. He is the owner and chairman of Ivoclar Vivadent, a Liechtenstein dental products company.

Early life
Zeller was born in Germany.

Career
Zeller joined Ivoclar Vivadent in 1981, and was CEO from 1990 to 2003, before buying the company from the founder's grandson, Adolf Schneider. He has been chairman and president of the supervisory board since 1993. He was also CEO of the company from 1990 to 2003.

On the Forbes 2018 list of the world's billionaires, he was ranked #572 with a net worth of US$3.9 billion. He is supposedly the only billionaire of Liechtenstein, and his fortune supposedly represents half of Liechtenstein's GDP.

Personal life
Zeller is married to Christina Zeller and resides in Vaduz, Liechtenstein. Christina Zeller joined the board of directors of Ivoclar Vivadent in June 2018.

Honours
 Commander's Cross of the Order of Merit of the Principality of Liechtenstein (06/09/2017).

References

1950s births
Living people
Year of birth missing (living people)
Liechtenstein billionaires
People from Vaduz